Veronica Vallejos-Marchant (born c. 1967) is the Head of the Projects and Environment Department at the Chilean Antarctic Institute (INACH) and a member of the Committee for Environmental Protection (CEP).  She is considered a trailblazer for Chilean women in Antarctic research.

Early life and education
Vallejos-Marchant was born and raised in Santiago, Chile and received her degree in Marine Biology from the University of Valparaiso followed by a Masters in Conservation of Natural Resources.

Career and impact
Vallejos-Marchant is the Head of the Projects and Environment Department at the Chilean Antarctic Institute (INACH) and a member of the Committee for Environmental Protection (CEP).  She first travelled to Antarctica in 1995  and has visited 10 times subsequently. She works to support Chilean Antarctic researchers in international collaboration.

References

Chilean women scientists
Living people
Chilean marine biologists
Women Antarctic scientists
Valparaiso University alumni
1960s births
People from Santiago